"Neelavelicham" is a short story written by Vaikom Muhammad Basheer. Beginning with the introduction of one of the miracles of the narrator's life, the story is about the tender relationship that develops between a young writer who must live in a house notorious for being haunted and the ghost of a girl who is believed to haunt the house. The story is included in the collection Pavapettavarude Veshya (The Prostitute of the Poor, 1952).

The story became the basis of a film called Bhargavi Nilayam (1964) whose script was also written by Vaikom Muhammad Basheer. A film titled Neelavelicham, based on the original short story by Basheer is to hit the theatres on April 2023.

Story

The Rental house 
A writer is in search of a rental home. He finds a relatively cheap home by the end of his search. He only came to know that the house is haunted after he moved into the home, paying two months of rent in advance. The name of the house was 'Bhargavi Nilayam'. The previous resident of the house called Bhargavi committed suicide by jumping into the well behind the house due to a love failure. It is believed that Bhargavi used to give a hard time to the residents of the house, especially men.

Stay 
Despite knowing all these, the writer decides to live there because he does not have other options. He starts talking to Bhargavi and narrates his problems. He tells her that even if she kills him, no one will be concerned. He tells her that he does not have any problems in Bhargavi living there, and he requests her to let him live there peacefully.

The writer soon makes Bhargavi his partner in everything he is doing, including his writing and music. Their relation grew so much that it became normal for him.

'The Magic' 
One day, while he was writing an emotional story, the light goes off in the heavy wind. He goes in search of some oil to pour in his oil lamp. He couldn't find it though, so he comes home disappointed. When he come home, he was surprised to see that his room is now well lit. The oil lamp which did not have any oil now has a two-inch-high blue flame.

The writer is amused and confused on who lit the light and where the blue light came from. There the story ends.

Publication 
The story is included in the following collections:

Translations
The story is translated into English by V. Abdulla under the title "The Blue Light". There are other translations of the work, including those by O. V. Usha and C. P. A. Vasudevan, both under the same title. The translations are included in the following collections:

Adaptations 
The story was made into a film titled Bhargavi Nilayam in 1964 when Vaikom Muhammad Basheer himself wrote the script for the film. It was the first film of director A. Vincent. Prem Nazir, Madhu and Vijaya Nirmala did the main characters in the film. The film had cinematography by P. Bhaskara Rao and by the music from M. S. Baburaj. This film became a blockbuster.

Soorya Krishnamoorthi did a light-and-sound show based on the story. Basheer had wanted Krishnamoorthi to write a second part for this show. A 2020 short film titled The Blue Light was an adaptation of the short story. The story also had theatrical adaptations.

A film titled Neelavelicham based on the original short story is scheduled for release in April 2023.

References

External links 
 "Neelavelicham" (Full Text in Malayalam) at Kerala State Library Council
 "The Blue Light" (Full Text in English). Translated from Malayalam by O. V. Usha. Available to borrow from the Internet Archive
 1, 2, 3, 4 A contemporary English translation of "Neelavelicham"

Further reading 
 Part 1, Part 2, Part 3. A three-part lecture series on "Neelavelicham". Indian Institute of Technology, Madras

Works adapted into films
Malayalam short stories
Short stories by Vaikom Muhammad Basheer